Karen Fröhlich née Haude is a retired German field hockey player.

Haude played for the clubs MTV Braunschweig and Eintracht Braunschweig. With Eintracht Braunschweig, she won five German championship titles. She also played 60 games in total for the German national team.

With West Germany, Haude won the 1981 Women's Hockey World Cup. She was also called up to the West German squad for the 1980 Summer Olympics. However, due to the 1980 Summer Olympics boycott, the West German team ultimately didn't enter the tournament.

In 1981, Haude was awarded the Silbernes Lorbeerblatt. In 1988, she was inducted into the hall of fame of the Lower Saxon Institute of Sports History.

References

External links 
 

Living people
20th-century births
German female field hockey players
Sportspeople from Braunschweig
Recipients of the Silver Laurel Leaf
Year of birth missing (living people)
20th-century German women